Finn Rausing (born 1954) is a Swedish billionaire heir and businessman. He is a co-owner of Tetra Laval, the packaging company, and co-owner of Sauber Motorsport and the Alfa Romeo Formula One team.

Early life
Finn Rausing is the son of Gad Rausing and Birgit Rausing.

Career
According to Forbes, Rausing has a net worth of $8.0 billion, as of October 2019.

Personal life
Rausing lives in England.

References 

1954 births
Living people
Swedish businesspeople
Swedish billionaires
Finn
Formula One team owners
Alfa Romeo people
Sauber Motorsport